See also The Lion and the Mouse (disambiguation).

The Lion and the Mouse (1928) is a part-silent/part-sound drama film produced by Warner Bros., directed by Lloyd Bacon, and based on the 1905 play by Charles Klein. The film marks the first time Lionel Barrymore, who was on loan out from MGM, spoke from the screen.

Plot
Judge Ross, on the Federal Bench, rules in favor of a large company in litigation before him, unaware that a smaller company in which he owns considerable stock has been subsumed by the larger firm, thus creating appearance of a conflict of interests. When one of the Judge's enemies plots to ruin the Judge over this apparent improper behavior, Judge Ross's daughter Shirley sets out to prove her father's innocence.

Cast
May McAvoy as Shirley Ross
Lionel Barrymore as John Ryder
Alec B. Francis as Judge Ross
William Collier Jr. as Jeffereson Ryder
Emmett Corrigan as Dr. Hays
Jack Ackroyd as Smith, Jeff's valet

Cast notes
Barrymore and McAvoy had last costarred in 1920 in The Devil's Garden.

Box Office
According to Warner Bros records the film earned $869,000 domestically and $100,000 foreign.

Preservation status
The movie survives in 35 mm at the Library of Congress and 16 mm at the University of Wisconsin–Madison. The soundtrack on Vitaphone discs partially survives in the UCLA Film and Television Archive.

See also
Lionel Barrymore filmography

References

External links
The Lion and the Mouse at IMDb.com
The Lion and the Mouse; allmovie.com online synopsis
preserved lantern slide to the film(*if photo doesn't load click the worthpoint link then return and click again)
nicely preserved lobby card (*if photo doesn't load click the worthpoint site then come back and click)
 cover of novelization of the play with scenes from Warner's production(archived)
original lobby poster(archived)

1928 films
Films directed by Lloyd Bacon
American films based on plays
Transitional sound drama films
American drama films
1928 drama films
Films based on fables
American black-and-white films
Films with screenplays by Robert Lord (screenwriter)
Warner Bros. films
1920s English-language films
1920s American films